Vermont Terrace is a heritage-listed residence at located 63-65 Lower Fort Street, in the inner city Sydney suburb of Millers Point in the City of Sydney local government area of New South Wales, Australia. The property was added to the New South Wales State Heritage Register on 2 April 1999.

History 
Millers Point is one of the earliest areas of European settlement in Australia, and a focus for maritime activities. This property is one of a pair of early Federation polychrome brick houses.

Description 
Two storey, four bedroom early Federation face brick house with attic and basement. Steeply pitched trussed timber gable to the street. Tall chimney. Highly decorative brickwork around door and windows, decorative stone sill to ground floor window. Storeys: Two; Construction: Polychrome face brick, slate, cast iron lace, and spear fence. Painted timber joinery. Style: Federation Arts and Crafts.

The external condition of the property is good.

Modifications and dates 
External: External timber work modified.

Heritage listing 
As at 23 November 2000, this early Federation polychrome brick terrace house is an important streetscape element.

It is part of the Millers Point Conservation Area, an intact residential and maritime precinct. It contains residential buildings and civic spaces dating from the 1830s and is an important example of 19th century adaptation of the landscape.

Vermont Terrace was listed on the New South Wales State Heritage Register on 2 April 1999.

See also 

Australian residential architectural styles
Regency Townhouses, 57-61 Lower Fort Street
Eagleton Terrace, 67-73 Lower Fort Street

References

Bibliography

Attribution

External links
 
 

New South Wales State Heritage Register sites located in Millers Point
Houses in Sydney
Articles incorporating text from the New South Wales State Heritage Register
Millers Point Conservation Area
20th-century architecture